Aktashevo (Aqtaş) is a rural locality (a village) in Kovardinsky Selsoviet, Gafuriysky District, Bashkortostan, Russia. The population was 126 as of 2010. There are 3 streets.

Geography 
Aktashevo is located 59 km northeast of Krasnousolsky (the district's administrative centre) by road. Yurmash is the nearest rural locality.

References 

Rural localities in Gafuriysky District